David Chokachi  (born David Al-Chokhachy; January 16, 1968) is an American film and television actor. He is known for his roles in the TV series Witchblade, Baywatch, and Beyond The Break.

Early life
David Chokachi was born in Plymouth, Massachusetts. His father is of Turkish-Iraqi origin and his mother is of Finnish origin from Vaasa, Finland.

He attended Tabor Academy, an elite boarding prep school in Marion, Massachusetts, where he played lacrosse and football. He graduated from Bates College in Lewiston, Maine, with a degree in political science.

Career
Chokachi began his acting career in 1995 on Baywatch in the role of Cody Madison, eventually replacing David Charvet as a main cast member. In 1999, he left Baywatch and took up the role of Jake McCartey in the TV series Witchblade, which lasted until 2002. Following that, he appeared in various TV series and made-for-TV movies. Chokachi then landed the role of main character Justin Healy on The N's 2006 TV series Beyond The Break. He also appeared on VH1's Confessions of a Teen Idol, a reality show in which former teen idols attempt to revitalize their careers.

Chokachi was one of People magazine's "50 Most Beautiful People in the World" in 1997.

Filmography

References

External links 
 
 

1968 births
Living people
American people of Finnish descent
American people of Iraqi descent
American people of Turkish descent
Iraqi Turkmen people
American male film actors
American male television actors
Bates College alumni
People from Plymouth, Massachusetts
Male actors from Massachusetts
Tabor Academy (Massachusetts) alumni